Carlos Córdoba (born 5 November 1958) is an Argentine football coach and former player. He played for Argentine club Boca Juniors and served as assistant coach of the Dallas Burn and head coach of the Miami Fusion. Córdoba played for Boca Juniors from the age 14 before moving to the United States in 1985 to begin his coaching career.

Playing career 
Córdoba spent his entire playing career at Buenos Aires club Boca Juniors.  He joined the club at age 14 and joined the first team at age 17.  Playing alongside football legend Diego Maradona, he helped the team win three Argentine First Division Championships and one world club title. He captained Boca Juniors from 1983 to 1984 before moving to the US in 1985 with hopes of coaching an MLS club. He played with the Tampa Bay Rowdies, Milwaukee Rampage, and San Diego Sockers in the US, Toronto Blizzard in Canada and Union and Huracon in Argentina.

Coaching career 
Córdoba's first professional coaching job was with the Milwaukee Rampage in 1995.  In 1996, Córdoba took a job as assistant coach of the Dallas Burn under former US goalkeeper David Dir.  In 1998 moved to being head coach of the Miami Fusion until being replaced by Brazilian Ivo Wortmann in July of the same year.

It was announced on December 18, 2018 that Córdoba will be the Milwaukee Torrent's head coach for the 2019 season.

References

1958 births
Living people
Argentine footballers
Boca Juniors footballers
FC Dallas non-playing staff
Miami Fusion coaches
Association football fullbacks
Argentine football managers